1. FC Schwalmstadt is a German association football club from the city of Schwalmstadt, Hesse which was established in 1970 through the amalgamation of the towns of Treysa and Ziegenhain together with some smaller outlying villages.



History
The recently formed club was created in 2003 out of the merger of the football departments of SV Jahn 1871 Treysa and TuSpo 1886 Ziegenhain. The team has enjoyed some early success, advancing to the Oberliga Hessen (IV) in its second season of play after capturing the championship of the Landesliga Hessen-Nord (V). The A-youth side also plays at the Oberliga level of its age class.

Predecessor side TuSpo Ziegenhain was established in 1886 as Turnverein Ziegenhain. In 1951 the club merged with Sportverein Rot-Weiß Ziegenhain to form Turn- und Sportverein Ziegenhain. The team won promotion to the Oberliga Hessen (IV) in 1979. They narrowly avoided relegation after a 15th-place finish in 1985 by defeating RSV Würges 1:0 in playoff, but were sent down in 1988 after finishing 17th. TuSpo made a first round DFB-Pokal (German Cup) appearance in 1982.

1. FC uses the grounds of both its parent associations to stage its home matches; the Schwalm-Stadion in Treysa and the Stadion am Fünften in Ziegenhain.

The club twice played in the Hessenliga, for four seasons from 2004 to 2008 and again, for two seasons, from 2009 to 2011. From the 2011–12 season, it played in the Verbandsliga once more until 2014, when it earned promotion back to the Hessenliga. It played in the Hessenliga in 2014–15, finished last in the league and was relegated again.

Honours
The club's honours:

League
 Landesliga Hessen-Nord (V)
 Champions: 1979 (TuSpo), 2004, 2009
 Verbandsliga Hessen-Nord (VI)
 Champions: 2014

Cup
 Hesse Cup
 Winners: 1981

References

External links
 Official team site (football)
 Official team site of ESV Jahn 1871 Treysa
 Official team site of TuSpo 1886 Ziegenhain
 1. FC Schwalmstadt at Weltfussball.de 

Football clubs in Germany
Football clubs in Hesse
Association football clubs established in 2003
2003 establishments in Germany